Achille is a town in Bryan County, Oklahoma, United States. As of the 2010 census, the town population was 492, a 2.8 percent decrease from the figure of 506 recorded in 2000. The town's name is derived from a Cherokee word, meaning fire.

History
The area that would become Achille was originally part of the Chickasaw Nation in Indian Territory. Cherokee refugees located to the area during the American Civil War and called it "", meaning fire.

The Missouri, Oklahoma and Gulf Railroad built a line that crossed the region in 1908 and a post office was established in the community in 1910. The community grew from an estimated population of 50 to 500 in 1920. The town's population had declined to 294 in 1960 and reached a peak number of 506 in 2000.

Geography

Demographics 

As of the census of 2010, there were 492 people living in the town.  The population density was 1,230 people per square mile (492/km).  There were 213 housing units at an average density of 552 per square mile (211/km).  The racial makeup of the town was 71.34% White, 0.20% African American, 22.33% Native American, 0.40% Asian, 0.40% from other races, and 5.34% from two or more races. Hispanic or Latino of any race were 0.59% of the population.

There were 188 households, out of which 63 (33.5%) included children under the age of 18, 82 (43.6%) were married couples living together, 36 (19.1%) consisted of a female householder with no husband present, 16 (8.5%) consisted of a male householder with no wife present, and 54 (28.7%) were non-families.  Households made up of a single individual living alone accounted for 46 (24.5%) of households, and 58 (30.9%) households consisted of someone living alone who was 65 years of age or older.  The average household size was 2.62 and the average family size was 3.10.

In the town, the population was spread out, with 25% under the age of 18, 10% from 18 to 24, 27.6% from 25 to 44, 22.6% from 45 to 64, and 14.8% who were 65 years of age or older.  The median age was 36.8 years.  For every 100 females, there were 95.4 males.  For every 100 females age 18 and over, there were 91.5 males.

The median income for a household in the town was $28,333,  and the median income for a family was $24,000. Males had a median income of $21,190 versus $14,904 for females.  The per capita income for the town was $11,324.  17.4% of the population were below the poverty line.  39.6% of those under the age of 18 and 9.8% are 65 or older.

Economy
The Choctaw Nation of Oklahoma headquarters, casinos, and other operations are located in nearby Durant and serve as a major employer in the region. Agriculture and tourism are both important industries.

Government

During his first term as mayor, back in 2017, David Northcutt was investigated for firing a shot toward the ground in an argument with his boyfriend, and eventually resigned.

On October 28, 2018, current Achille Mayor David Northcutt, was arrested with an accomplice, Joshua Doughty, for first degree burglary and methamphetamine possession charges. Northcutt was released after posting $10,000 bail.

In December 2018, Achille Councilman Lynn Chambers was arrested and charged along with 4 others, for methamphetamine trafficking and gun possession while committing a felony. 200 grams of methamphetamine, 2 pounds of marijuana and several guns were discovered by police. Child endangerment charges are being considered as children were living at the location  

In 2019, items including guns, drugs, and cash that had been seized by the Achille Police went missing from the police evidence locker, prompting an investigation by the Oklahoma State Bureau of Investigation. Police Chief Chris Watson had handed the key to the evidence locker to the town's Board Of Trustees shortly before the breach, after having been suspended and then fired by the Board. "I cannot say that I am surprised because that entire city council is corrupt to the core" said Watson.

Education 
Achille served by Achille Independent School District.

Notable person
While not born in the town, country singer and actor Gene Autry was raised partially in Achille.

References

External links
 Encyclopedia of Oklahoma History and Culture - Achille
 Achille Public Schools

Towns in Bryan County, Oklahoma
Towns in Oklahoma